The 2nd ACTRA Awards were presented on April 30, 1973 to honour achievements in Canadian television in 1972. The ceremony was hosted by Pierre Berton, and featured several new categories which had not been presented at the 1st ACTRA Awards the previous year.

Winners and nominees

References

ACTRA
ACTRA
ACTRA Awards